Mirattal is a 2012 Tamil language action romantic comedy film directed by R. Madhesh starring Vinay, Sharmila Mandre and Prabhu in the lead roles, Pradeep Rawat, Pandiarajan, and Santhanam in supporting roles, and Rishi in a cameo. A remake of the successful Telugu film, Dhee. the film was released on 2 August 2012.

Plot 
Babloo (Vinay) is a happy-go-lucky person who gets sent by his father (Pandiarajan) to Shankar Dhadha (Prabhu), a big don in the city. Shankar has a vengeance on Soori (Pradeep Rawat). Babloo meets Deepika (Sharmila Mandre), Shankar's sister, and love blossoms between them. One day, they get married in a temple, and some goons sent by Soori attack Babloo and Deepika. Babloo fights them, and Shankar comes there. Comedy gets in place as Deepika's engagement takes place, when suddenly, some goons kidnap her. Shankar and Babloo kill the goons and Soori and rescue Deepika.

Cast 

 Vinay as Ashok (Babloo)
 Sharmila Mandre as Deepika
 Prabhu as Shankar Dhadha
 Rishi as Gautham (cameo)
 Pradeep Rawat as Soori
 Ranjith Velayudhan as Soorya
 Pandiarajan as Babloo's father
 Santhanam as Chari
 Mansoor Ali Khan as Shankar's father
 Ganja Karuppu as Kathi
 Uma as Babloo's mother
 Yuvarani as Shankar's wife
 Viju Kailas as Ghani
 Bosskey
 Master Bharath 
 Jangiri Madhumitha
 Mahanadi Shankar
 Bagla

Production
The film is remake of the successful Telugu language film, Dhee, and originally Madhesh approached Genelia D'Souza to reprise her role in the original and pair up with Vinay. She did not accept, however, and Sharmila Mandre was subsequently signed on to replace Genelia and make her debut in Tamil films. In September 2010, filming of the songs were held across regions in England with scenes canned near castles in Richmond and Windsor in London. The team also shot at Bath, becoming the first Indian film to do so. Other locations in England where the songs where filmed include Eastbourne near Brighton, Oxfordshire and Surrey. The fight sequence was shot at London’s famous landmarks like the University of East London, the Tower Bridge, areas around the Buckingham Palace, Oxford University Aerodrome and London Airport with three cameras. The film's title was changed from Thillu Mullu to Mirattal in November 2011.

Release
The satellite rights of the film were sold to Sun TV.

Soundtrack
The soundtrack was composed by Pravin Mani.

Reception
Rohit Ramachandran of Nowrunning.com rated it 1.5 out of 5 saying that it "numbs the senses". Vivek Ramz of in.com rated it 2.5 out of 5, and added that the film "lacks in the action department but makes up for it by scoring on the entertainment front". Malathi Rangarajan of The Hindu wrote, "‘Hundred per cent Thillu Mullu’ is the tagline — ‘and zero per cent logic’ would have described Mirattal better."

References

External links
 
 Mirattal at Jointscene

2012 films
Films shot in England
Tamil remakes of Telugu films
2010s Tamil-language films